The Playboy of the Western World is a 1962 film version of the 1907 play written by John Millington Synge. It was directed and co-written by Brian Desmond Hurst and stars Gary Raymond and Siobhán McKenna.  Filmed in County Kerry, the film features many of the Abbey Players. The film was produced by the Four Provinces company created in 1952 by Hurst and Michael Morris, 3rd Baron Killanin who had previously produced John Ford’s The Rising of the Moon and Gideon's Day.

Plot
A young man from a far away village appears in County Mayo announcing to all and sundry that he has murdered his father with a blow to the head.  With the tale growing in the telling, the young man becomes a local hero, until his angry father comes to fetch him home.

Cast
 Gary Raymond as Christy Mahon 
 Siobhán McKenna as Pegeen Mike 
 Elspeth March as The Widow Quinn 
 Liam Redmond as Michael James
 Niall MacGinnis as Old Man Mahon

Production
The film was shot at Inch Strand in Dingle Peninsula, co Kerry. William Constable, the art director built a cottage close to the beach.

Home Media 
After years of unavailability, the film was remastered from the original film elements and released on both DVD and Blu-Ray by Network Distributing in May 2021. The release includes an image gallery, a trailer, and an interview with Gary Raymond recorded in March 2021.

References

External links
Short film on Brian Desmond Hurst's Playboy of the Western World featuring part of the soundtrack

The Playboy of the Western World at the website dedicated to Brian Desmond Hurst
The Playboy of the Western World The photographer Padraig Kennelly remembers the shooting of the film

British comedy films
1960s English-language films
Films shot in Ireland
Films shot in the Republic of Ireland
Films set in Ireland
Films directed by Brian Desmond Hurst
American films based on plays
British films based on plays